The 1999 Gerry Weber Open was a men's tennis tournament played on outdoor grass courts. It was the 7th edition of the Gerry Weber Open, and was part of the World Series of the 1999 ATP Tour. It took place at the Gerry Weber Stadion in Halle, North Rhine-Westphalia, Germany, from 7 June through 13 June 1999. Seventh-seeded Nicolas Kiefer won the singles title.

Finals

Singles

 Nicolas Kiefer defeated  Nicklas Kulti 6–3, 6–2
 It was Kiefer's 2nd singles title of the year and the 3rd of his career.

Doubles

 Jonas Björkman /  Patrick Rafter defeated  Paul Haarhuis /  Jared Palmer 6–3, 7–5

References

External links
 Official website 
 ITF tournament edition details

 
Gerry Weber Open
Halle Open
1999 in German tennis